Vikeså or Vigjeså is the administrative centre of Bjerkreim municipality in Rogaland county, Norway. The lake Svelavatnet lies along the south side of the village.

The village is the largest village in the municipality. It is the seat of the municipal council and the main commercial area in the municipality including a Coop Extra store.

References

Villages in Rogaland
Bjerkreim